Nusatidia is a genus of Asian sac spiders first described by Christa L. Deeleman-Reinhold in 2001.

Species
 it contains fourteen species:
Nusatidia aeria (Simon, 1897) – China, Borneo (Malaysia, Brunei), Indonesia (Sumatra)
Nusatidia bimaculata (Simon, 1897) – Sri Lanka
Nusatidia borneensis Deeleman-Reinhold, 2001 – Indonesia (Sumatra, Borneo)
Nusatidia camouflata Deeleman-Reinhold, 2001 – China, Thailand
Nusatidia changao Yu & Li, 2021 – China
Nusatidia javana (Simon, 1897) (type) – Indonesia (Java, Krakatau)
Nusatidia luzonica (Simon, 1897) – Philippines
Nusatidia manipisea (Barrion & Litsinger, 1995) – Philippines
Nusatidia melanobursa Deeleman-Reinhold, 2001 – Indonesia (Sumatra)
Nusatidia mianju Yu & Li, 2021 – China
Nusatidia pandalira Barrion-Dupo, Barrion & Heong, 2013 – China
Nusatidia snazelli Deeleman-Reinhold, 2001 – Indonesia (Java, Sumatra)
Nusatidia subjavana Yu & Li, 2021 – China
Nusatidia vietnamensis Logunov & Jäger, 2015 – Vietnam

References

Araneomorphae genera
Clubionidae
Spiders of Asia